The Thailand women's national beach handball team is the national team of Thailand. It is governed by the Handball Association of Thailand and takes part in international beach handball competitions.

Results

World Championships
2012 – 11th place
2014 – 9th place
2016 – 9th place
2018 – 15th place
2022 – Qualified

Southeast Asian Beach Handball Championship
2017 –

References

External links
IHF profile

Beach handball
Women's national beach handball teams